Anne Minter (born 3 April 1963) is a former tennis player from Australia.

She competed for her native country at the 1988 Summer Olympics in Seoul, and was an Australian Institute of Sport scholarship holder. Minter won four singles titles on the WTA Tour: 1987 Taipei, Singapore; 1988 Puerto Rico; 1989 Taipei. She was a quarterfinalist at the Australian Open in 1988, beating fourth seed Pam Shriver in the fourth round. She twice reached the fourth round at Wimbledon, upsetting ninth seed Hana Mandlíková in the third round in 1988. She reached her highest individual ranking at no. 23 on 4 July 1988. On 19 March 1990, she reached her career-high doubles ranking or 68. Her playing career spanned from 1981 until 1992. Minter's win–loss record for singles stands at 258–245.

Tennis career

Fed Cup
Minter made her Fed Cup debut for Australia in 1981 and played successively until 1989 only missing 1982 and 1983. In 1984, she led Australia to the final of the World Group where Australia lost narrowly 2–1 to Czechoslovakia. In 1989, Minter and the Australians lost in the semifinals to Spain, with Minter's losing in three sets to Arantxa Sánchez Vicario. This was her last appearance as an Australian player. By this time, her record stood at 20 wins (6 losses). In singles, it was a 16–6 winning record (4–0 in doubles).

Olympics and Grand Slam tournaments
Anne Minter played at the 1988 Seoul Olympics, reaching the second round of the tennis competition.

Her Grand Slam debut came in 1981. Her best performance was at the 1988 Australian Open when she reached the quarterfinals.

Personal life
Minter married her former tennis coach Graeme Harris. They got married in a church in Box Hill, Australia. Together, they have three children. The eldest, Caterina Harris was born in 1992, followed by Andrew Harris in 1994, and lastly Samantha Harris in 1995. Caterina Harris is a former state triathlete and currently is studying an Arts/Law degree at Deakin University. Andrew Harris and Samantha Harris both pursued tennis. Andrew earned tennis scholarship at the University of Oklahoma, and Samantha earned a tennis scholarship at Duke University. Andrew has had a successful tennis career thus far, winning both the Wimbledon Junior Doubles titles and French Open Junior Doubles titles with his partner Nick Kyrgios. He was a former top 10 junior in the world.

Following her tennis career, Minter pursued tennis coaching;

WTA career finals

Singles: 7 (4 titles, 3 runner-ups)

Doubles: 1 title

Mixed doubles: 1 runner-up

References

External links
 
 
 
 

1963 births
Living people
Australian female tennis players
Australian Open (tennis) junior champions
Olympic tennis players of Australia
Tennis people from Victoria (Australia)
Tennis players at the 1988 Summer Olympics
Australian Institute of Sport tennis players
Grand Slam (tennis) champions in girls' singles